Ferrocarriles Patagónicos was an Argentine State-owned railway company that built and operated several rail lines in Patagonia region. FP were part of the Argentine State Railway created in 1909 during the presidency of José Figueroa Alcorta.

History

In 1900 two British-owned companies were operating railways in Patagonia; the Central Chubut metre gauge, line between Puerto Madryn and Trelew and the Buenos Aires Great Southern broad gauge line between Bahía Blanca and Neuquén. During the presidency of José Figueroa Alcorta, the Argentine government devised a plan in 1908 to populate Patagonia by constructing two additional broad gauge, railway lines in that part of the country. The first line one was to run from San Antonio Oeste, in Rio Negro Territory (later to become Rio Negro Province), via Valcheta to Nahuel Huapi Lake, and the second from Puerto Deseado via Colonia San Martín to a junction with the first line. The second line was to have branches to Comodoro Rivadavia, via Sarmiento, to Colonia 16 de Octubre and to Buenos Aires Lake.

These lines came under the administration of Argentine State Railway in 1914. Meanwhile, the line from San Antonio Oeste, started at the end of 1908, reached Km 217 in 1911 and Maquinchao two years later. In 1916 this line also came under the administration of Ferrocarriles del Estado, was extended to Ingeniero Jacobacci in 1917 and to Bariloche in 1934.

When at mid 1930s the road transport became a serious competitor of rail transport, the EFEA acquired some railcars for the Patagonian railways (apart from other lines) to Hungarian company Ganz Works. The units were sent to serve the Carmen de Patagones–Bariloche line. The rolling stock arrived in Argentina in 1938, being operative since December that year.

With the railway nationalisation carried out by Juan Perón's administration in 1948, Ferrocarriles Patagónicos network became part of Ferrocarril General Roca.

Railway network
Ferrocarriles Patagónicos network as of 1936:

See also
 Argentine State Railway
 General Roca Railway

Bibliography 
British Steam on the Pampas by D.S. Purdom - Mechanical Engineering Publications Ltd, London (1977)

References 

P
P
P
P
1908 establishments in Argentina
Transport in Río Negro Province
Transport in Chubut Province
Transport in Santa Cruz Province, Argentina